Peter B. Martin, Sr. (1915–1992) was an American photographer and publisher. Martin was one of the top New York City publishing photographers in the 1950s, with work published in Mademoiselle, Cosmopolitan, Life, and McCall's.

From the late 1940s to the 1960s, he was a fashion photographer and photojournalist. He photographed many celebrities including Frank Sinatra, Bunk Johnson, Edgar Bergen, Imogene Coca, Edward R Murrow, Arthur Schlesinger, Jr, Leonard Bernstein, Eleanor Roosevelt, Natalie Wood, James Dean, Vera Zorina, Kim Novak, Ann Francis, Sheree North, Walt Disney, Jack Webb, the Allman Brothers, Jim Morrison, The Doors, Jimi Hendrix, The Grateful Dead and Janis Joplin.
In addition to his photography, Martin published periodicals about photography (Figure and Photography Workshop) during the early 1950s, and in the late 1950s and 1960s he published television and music magazines (Movie Teen Illustrated and Pop Rock).

Photography Workshop
New York was a photojournalism mecca in the 1950s, and Peter Martin's "studio 61" at 286 Bleecker Street in Greenwich Village, New York, was a gathering place for many photographers at that time. Many contributed to the Photography Workshop publication, which was devoted to the photographer's work, techniques, equipment and art.

Photography Workshop Summer 1950 contents
Editor: Peter Martin; Associate Editors: Fred Sparks, Joan Marsh, Fred Lyon
Technical Story of the Year
Parlor, Bedlam and Flashbulb
Photo-Journalism
The Case History of A Picture Story "Fairy Tale On Fifth Avenue"
Fashion Photography
The Ford Girls
Portrait Photography
Figure Photography (Fred Lyon)
The Reluctant Photographer
The Photographer in Europe (by Fred Sparks)
The Child as a Photographic Subject
A Subject Eyes The Photographer
Four Picture Assignments
Circle of Confusion (photos by Peter Martin)

Photography Workshop Fall 1950 contents
The Photographer's Story
Press Photography
Voodoo Photography (Earl Leaf)
The LIfe, Times and Photographs of Halsman
Thumbnail Photographs 1935–1950
Damascus: An Early Picture HIstory
Philippe & The Rita
Portraits
42 Life Magazine Halsman Covers
Theatre and Dance
Salvador Dalí
Model "t" Fashion Photography
Halsman Technique
Figure Photography
Anatomic props

Photography Workshop Fall 1951 contents
Assignment in Studio 61
12 Photographers:
Fred Lyon
Fernand Fonssagrives
Ruth Orkin
Stephen Colhoun
Dan Wynn
Gleb Derrujinsky, Jr.
Herbert Giles
Jerry Yulsman
Genevieve Naylor
Richard Litwin
Ted Croner
W. Eugene Smith

References 

American portrait photographers
Photographers from New York (state)